Physena is the sole genus of the flowering plant family Physenaceae.  It contains two species of shrubs and small trees which are endemic to Madagascar. The APG II system, of 2003 (unchanged from the APG system, of 1998), does recognize this family and assigns it to the order Caryophyllales in the clade core eudicots.

References

External links
 Physenaceae in L. Watson and M.J. Dallwitz (1992 onwards). The families of flowering plants: descriptions, illustrations, identification, information retrieval. Version: 30 May 2006. http://delta-intkey.com 
 NCBI Taxonomy Browser
 Physenaceae at the DELTA database

Caryophyllales
Caryophyllales genera
Endemic flora of Madagascar